The following is a list of stadiums in Africa.

List

Algeria
Stade 5 Juillet 1962, Algiers
Stade 19 Mai 1956, Annaba
Stade 24 Fevrier 1956, Sidi Bel Abbes
Stade Ahmed Zabana, Oran
Stade Mohamed Hamlaoui, Constantine
Stade Omar Hammadi, Bologhine
Stade 20 Aout 1955, Skikda
Rouibah Hocine Stadium, Jijel
Stade Mustapha Tchaker, Blida
Stade Ahmed Kaïd, Tiaret
Stade Tahar Zoughari, Relizane
Stade 13 Avril 1958, Saïda
Stade Akid Lotfi, Tlemcen

Angola
Estádio 11 de Novembro, Luanda
Estádio da Cidadela, Luanda
Estádio Nacional de Ombaka, Benguela
Estádio Nacional do Chiazi, Cabinda
Estádio Nacional da Tundavala, Lubango
Estádio do Santos, Viana
Estádio Joaquim Dinis, Luanda
Estádio Municipal de Benguela, Benguela

Benin
Stade de l'Amitié, Cotonou

Botswana
Botswana National Stadium, Gaborone
Francis-town Stadium
New Lobatse Stadium
Molepolole Stadium
Maun Stadium
Phikwe Stadium
University of Botswana Stadium

Burkina Faso
Stade du 4-Août, Ouagadougou
Stade Balibiè, Koudougou
Statde Municipal, Bobo Dioulasso

Burundi
Prince Louis Rwagasore Stadium, Bujumbura

Cameroon
Stade de la Reunification, Douala
Stade Ahmadou Ahidjo, Yaoundé
Stade Omnisport de Limbe, Limbe
Stade de Mbouda, Mbouda
Stade Roumde Adjia, Garoua
Stade Militaire, Yaoundé
Stade Mbappé Léppé, Douala 
Stade de Moliko, Buea 

Stade Omnisport de Bafoussam, Bafoussam
Stade Paul Biya, Yaoundé 
Stade Roger Milla, Douala
Stade de la GP, Yaoundé

Cape Verde
Estádio da Várzea, Praia

Central African Republic
Barthelemy Boganda Stadium, Bangui

Chad
Stade Nacional, N'Djamena

Comoros
Stade de Beaumer, Moroni
Stade Said Mohamed Cheikh, Moroni

Congo-Brazzaville
Stade de la Revolution, Brazzaville

Democratic Republic of the Congo
Stade des Martyrs, Kinshasa
Stade Municipal de Lubumbashi, Lubumbashi

Djibouti
Stade du Ville, Djibouti

Egypt

6 October Stadium, Cairo
30 June Stadium, Cairo
Abou Qir Fertilizers Stadium, Alexandria
Ala'ab Damanhour Stadium, Damanhour
Alexandria Stadium, Alexandria
Aluminium Stadium, Nag Hammadi
Arish Stadium, Arish
Al Assiouty Sport Stadium, Assiut
Assiut University Stadium, Assiut
Aswan Stadium, Aswan
Banha Stadium, Banha
Beni Ebeid Stadium, Beni Ebeid
Beni Suef Stadium, Beni Suef
Borg El Arab Stadium, Alexandria
Cairo International Stadium, Cairo
Cairo Military Academy Stadium, Cairo
Desouk Stadium, Desouk
Eastern Company Stadium, Cairo
Egyptian Army Stadium, Suez
Ezzedin Yacoub Stadium, Alexandria
Fayoum Stadium, Fayoum
Ghazl El Mahalla Stadium, El Mahalla
El Gouna Stadium, El Gouna
Haras El Hodoud Stadium, Alexandria
Helmy Zamora Stadium, Cairo
Ismailia Stadium, Ismailia
Ittihad Nabarouh Stadium, Nabarouh
Kafr El Sheikh Stadium, Kafr El Sheikh
KIMA Aswan Stadium, Aswan
Luxor Stadium, Luxor
El Mansoura Stadium, El Mansoura
Al Masry Club Stadium, Port Said
Matai Stadium, Beni Mazar
Al Merreikh Stadium, Port Said
El Minya University Stadium, El Minya
Mit Okba Stadium, Giza
Mokhtar El Tetsh Stadium, Cairo
El Monufia University Stadium, Shebin El Koum
MS Abnub Stadium, Dayrout
MS Koum Hamada Stadium, Koum Hamada
National Bank of Egypt Stadium, Cairo
Nogoom El Mostakbal Stadium, Cairo
Osman Ahmed Osman Stadium, Cairo
Petro Sport Stadium, Cairo
Police Academy Stadium, Cairo
Qena Stadium, Qena
Ras El Bar Stadium, Damietta
Al Rebat & Al Anwar Stadium, Port Said
Al Salam Stadium, Cairo
El Sekka El Hadid Stadium, Cairo
Sherbeen Stadium, Sherbeen
El Shams Stadium, Cairo
Sharm El Sheikh Stadium, Sharm El Sheikh
Sohag Stadium, Sohag
Suez Canal Stadium, Ismailia
Suez Stadium, Suez
Tanta Stadium, Tanta
Al Walideya Stadium, Assiut
Zagazig Stadium, Zagazig
Zagazig University Stadium, Zagazig
Al Zarka Stadium, Al Zarka

Equatorial Guinea
Estadio Internacional, Malabo

Eritrea
ChicChero Stadium, Asmara
Dekemhare Stadium, Dekemhare
Denden Stadium, Asmara
Keren Stadium, Keren
Olympic Stadium, Asmara

Ethiopia
Abebe Bikila Stadium, Addis Ababa
Adama Stadium, Adama
Addis Ababa Stadium, Addis Ababa
Hawassa Kenema Stadium, Hawassa
Bahir Dar Stadium, Bahir Dar
Dire Dawa Stadium, Dire Dawa
Harrar Bira Stadium, Harari
Mekele Stadium, Mekele
Tigray Stadium, Tigray
Wonji Stadium, Wonji
Addis Ababa National Stadium, Addis Ababa
Hawassa Stadium, Hawassa

Gabon
Stade Omar Bongo, Libreville
Stade d'Angondjé, Libreville
Stade d'Oyem, Oyem
Stade de Port-Gentil, Port-Gentil
Stade Idriss Ngari, Owendo

Gambia
Independence Stadium, Bakau

Ghana
Accra Sports Stadium, Accra
Baba Yara Stadium, Kumasi
Tamale Stadium, Tamale
Sekondi-Takoradi Stadium, Sekondi
Len Clay Stadium, Obuasi
Cape Coast Sports Stadium, Cape Coast

Guinea
Nongo Stadium, Conakry
Stade 28 Septembre, Conakry

Guinea Bissau
Estádio 24 de Setembro, Bissau
Estádio Lino Correia, Bissau

Ivory Coast
Stade Félix Houphouet-Boigny, Abidjan
Stade Bouaké, Bouaké

Kenya
Moi International Sports Centre, Kasarani, Nairobi
Nairobi City Stadium
Nyayo National Stadium, Nairobi
RFUEA Ground, Nairobi,

Lesotho
National Stadium, Maseru

Liberia
National Complex, Monrovia

Libya
June 11 Stadium, Tripoli
March 28 Stadium, Benghazi

Madagascar
Mahama Sina Stadium, Antananarivo

Malawi
Kamazu Stadium, Blantyre

Mali
Stade 26 Mars, Bamako

Stade Olympique Nouakchott

Mauritius
Stade Anjalay, Belle Vue Maurel
Stade George V, Curepipe

Mayotte
Stade Cavani, Mamoudzou

Morocco

Stade de Tanger, Tanger
National Cricket Stadium, Tangier
Stade de Marchan, Tangier
Stade d'Agadir, Agadir
Stade Al Inbiaâte, Agadir
Stade Moulay Rachid, Laâyoune
Stade Cheikh Laaghdef, Laâyoune
Stade Complexe Sportif, Fes
Salle 11th November, Fes
Stade d'Honneur, Oujda
Stade de Marrakech, Marrakech
Stade El Harti, Marrakech
Grand Stade de Casablanca, Casablanca
Stade Larbi Benbarek, Casablanca
Stade Larbi Zaouli, Casablanca
Stade Mohammed V, Casablanca
Salle Mohammed V, Casablanca
Stade Sidi Bernoussi, Casablanca
Stade Pere Jego, Casablanca
Stade Moulay Abdellah, Rabat
Stade Marche Verte, Rabat
Salle Ibn Yassine, Rabat
Salle Moulay Abdellah, Rabat
Stade de FUS, Rabat
Stade d'Honneur (Meknes), Meknes
Saniat Rmel, Tétouan
Stade Municipal (Kenitra), Kenitra
Stade El Abdi, El Jadida
Stade El Bachir, Mohammédia, Mohammedia
Stade Mimoun Al Arsi, Al Hoceima
Stade Boubker Ammar, Salé
Stade El Massira, Safi
Complexe OCP, Khouribga
Stade du 18 novembre, Khemisset

Mozambique
Estádio do Costa do Sol, Maputo
Estádio do Desportivo, Maputo
Estádio da Machava, Maputo
Estádio do Maxaquene, Maputo
Estádio do Zimpeto, Maputo

Namibia
Independence Stadium, Windhoek
Sam Nujoma Stadium, Windhoek

Niger
Général Seyni Kountché Stadion, Niamey

Nigeria

Abuja Stadium, Abuja
Ahmadou Bello Stadium, Kaduna
Enyimba International Stadium, Aba
Gateway Stadium, Abeokuta
Jalingo City Stadium, Jalingo City
Obafemi Awolowo Stadium
Liberation Stadium, Port Harcourt
Nnamdi Azikiwe Stadium' Enugu
Omoku Township Stadium, Omoku
Lagos National Stadium, Lagos
Samuel Ogbemudia Stadium' Benin City
Sani Abacha Stadium' Kano
Sharks Stadium, Port Harcourt
Teslim Balogun Stadium, Surlere, Lagos
UJ Esuene Stadium' Calabar
Warri Township Stadium, Warri

Réunion
Stade de l'Est, St. Denis
Stade Paul Julius Bénard, Saint-Paul

Rwanda
Stade Amahoro, Kigali
Kigali stadium,Kigali
Huye stadium,Huye
Ngoma stadium,Ngoma

Saint Helena
Francis Plain Playing Field, Francis Plain

São Tomé and Príncipe
Estádio Nacional 12 de Julho, São Tomé

Senegal
Stade Leopold Senghor, Dakar

Seychelles
La Digue Playing Fields, Anse Réunion
Mount Fleuri Stadium, Mount Fleuri
Stade Linité, Roche Caiman
Stade d'Amitié, Praslin

Sierra Leone
National Stadium, Freetown

Somalia
Eng.Yariisow Stadium, Mogadishu
Mogadiscio Stadium, Mogadiscio
Hargeisa Stadium, Hargeisa
Alamzey Stadium, Burao
Mayor Abdalla Stadium, Berbera
Qoobdooro Stadium, Karaan Banaadir

South Africa

ABSA Stadium, Durban
Atteridgeville Super Stadium, Atteridgeville
Charles Mopeli Stadium, Phuthaditjhaba
Ellis Park Stadium, Johannesburg
EPRFU Stadium, Port Elizabeth
FNB Stadium, Johannesburg
Free State Stadium (aka Vodacom Park), Bloemfontein
Giant Stadium, Soshanguve, Pretoria
Giyani Stadium, Giyani
Green Point Stadium, Cape Town
HM Pitje Stadium, Mamelodi
Johannesburg Stadium, Johannesburg
Loftus Versfeld Stadium, Pretoria
Mbombela Stadium, Nelspruit
Mmabatho Stadium, Mafikeng
Moses Mabhida Stadium, Durban
Nelson Mandela Bay Stadium, Port Elizabeth
Newlands Stadium, Cape Town
Odi Stadium, Mabopane
Olympia Stadium, Rustenburg
Orlando Stadium, Orlando
HM Pitje Stadium, Pretoria
Peter Mokaba Stadium, Polokwane
Pietersburg Stadium, Pietersburg
Potgietersrus Rugby Stadium, Johannesburg
Rand Stadium, Johannesburg
Royal Bafokeng Stadium, Rustenburg
SuperSport Park, Centurion
Thohoyandou Stadium, Thohoyandou

South Sudan
Juba Stadium, Juba

Sudan
Khartoum Stadium, Khartoum

Swaziland
Somhlolo National Stadium, Lobamba

Tanzania
Amaan Stadium, Zanzibar
Benjamin Mkapa National Stadium, Dar es Salaam
CCM Kirumba Stadium, Mwanza
Lake Tanganyika Stadium, Kigoma
National Stadium, Dar es Salaam

Togo
Stade de Kégué, Lomé

Tunisia
Stade 7 November, Rades
Stade El Menzah, Tunis
Stade Olympique de Sousse, Sousse
Stade Mustapha Ben Jannet, Monastir
Stade Taieb Mhiri, Sfax
Stade 15 Octobre, Bizerte
Stade Chedli Zouiten, Tunis
Stade Bou Kornine, Hammam Lif
Stade Municipal de Gabès, Gabès
Stade Abdelaziz Chtioui, La Marsa
Stade Municipal de Jendouba, Jendouba
Stade Ali Zouaoui, Kairouan
Stade 7 Novembre du Kef, El Kef
Stade du 7 Novembre de Gafsa, Gafsa
Stade Jlidi, Zarzis
Stade Hedi Ennaifer, Le Bardo
Stade Olympique (Beja), Béja
Stade de Kasserine, Kasserine
Stade du 7-Mars, Ben Guerdane
Stade Nejib Khattab, Tataouine
Stade Municipal de Métlaoui, Métlaoui
Stade Ameur El-Gargouri, Sfax

Uganda
 National Stadium, Kampala
 Mbale Municipal; Stadium, Mbale
 Pece Stadium, Gulu

Western Sahara
Stade El Aaiún, El Aaiún

Zambia
 National Heroes Stadium, Lusaka
 Independence Stadium, Lusaka
 Levy Mwanawasa Stadium, Ndola

Zimbabwe
Barbourfields Stadium, Bulawayo
National Sports Stadium, Harare
Rufaro Stadium, Harare

See also
List of stadiums in Asia
List of stadiums in Central America and the Caribbean
List of stadiums in Europe
List of stadiums in North America
List of stadiums in Oceania
List of stadiums in South America
List of African stadiums by capacity

References

External links 
Atlas of worldwide soccer stadiums for GoogleEarth ***NEW***
worldstadiums
Football Stadiums
Football Temples of the World

Stadiums
Africa